Hema Gamang (born 31 March 1961) is a political and social worker and a Member of Parliament elected from the Koraput constituency in the Indian  state of Odisha as an Indian National Congress candidate.

Gamang was born on 31 March 1961 in Khilapadar in Koraput district, Odisha. Gamang is an intermediate graduate and completed her schooling from Rama Devi Women's College, Bhubaneshwar, Odisha. She married Giridhar Gamang on 4 April 1975 and has two sons and a daughter.

Gamang was elected to the 13th Lok Sabha in 1999. From 1999 to 2000, she was a member on the Committee on Urban and Rural Development. Then, from 2000 to 2004, she served as a member on Consultative Committee, Ministry of Steel. She was also a Member of Telephone Advisory Committee, Odisha.

References

India MPs 1999–2004
Women in Odisha politics
Lok Sabha members from Odisha
1961 births
Living people
Articles created or expanded during Women's History Month (India) - 2014
Indian National Congress politicians from Odisha
Biju Janata Dal politicians
20th-century Indian women politicians
20th-century Indian politicians
21st-century Indian women politicians
21st-century Indian politicians
People from Koraput district